Cantley is a village and former civil parish, now in the parish of Cantley, Limpenhoe and Southwood, in the Broadland district, in the English county of Norfolk. Cantley is within the Broads Special Protection Area and lies on the north bank of the River Yare, some 17 km east of Norwich and 15 km south-west of Great Yarmouth. In the 2011 census, Cantley had a population of 733 people living in 279 households.

History
Cantley's name is of Anglo-Saxon origin and derives from the Old English for Canta's glade or meadow.

In the Domesday Book, Cantley is recorded as a settlement of 58 households located in the hundred of Blofield. The village was owned by William I.

Sugar has been processed in Cantley since as early as 1912 with the site still in operation today by British Sugar, forming one of the four British sugar processing factories.

In April 1935, the parish absorbed Limpenhoe and Southwood into a larger parish. In 1931 the parish (prior to the merge) had a population of 291.

St. Margaret's Church
Cantley's Parish Church is of Norman origin and is dedicated to Saint Margaret. The church was significantly rebuilt in the Fourteenth and Nineteenth Centuries.

Politics
At Parliament Cantley is represented by Jerome Mayhew MP, the Conservative member for Broadland.

Amenities
The majority of local children attend Cantley Primary School and is part of the Coastal Together Federation of local primary schools. In 2021, the school was rated as 'Good' by Ofsted.

Cantley is served by Cantley railway station which opened in 1844 on the Yarmouth & Norwich Railway. Today, the station lies on the Wherry Line with regular to Great Yarmouth, Lowestoft and Norwich.

War Memorial
Cantley's War Memorial takes the form of a marble and stone plaque located inside St. Margaret's Church. It lists the names of the following fallen for the First World War:
 Second-Lieutenant Augustus C. H. Sillem (1889-1916), 52nd Brigade, Royal Field Artillery
 Skipper Ernest R. Browne DSC (d.1919), H.M. Drifter Cromoma
 Corporal Ernest Brinded (1892-1917), 8th Battalion, Royal Fusiliers
 Bombardier Samuel G. Jones (1881-1917), 95th Brigade, Royal Field Artillery
 Private Arthur C. W. Woodhouse (1885-1917), 8th Battalion, Durham Light Infantry
 Private Harry R. Golden (1898-1918), 248th Company, Machine Gun Corps
 Private Bertie Turner (1893-1916), 2nd Battalion, Royal Norfolk Regiment
 Private David Futter (1887-1915), 4th Battalion, Royal Norfolk Regiment
 Private John Abel (1893-1916), 7th Battalion, Royal Norfolk Regiment
 Private Sydney G. Turner (1893-1916), 7th Battalion, Royal Norfolk Regiment

And, the following for the Second World War:
 Private Robert J. Farrow (1912-1944), 1st Battalion, Royal Hampshire Regiment
 Sergeant Bernard J. Monsey (1921-1944), No. 18 Squadron RAF

References

External links
 Cantley Parish Council website

 
Villages in Norfolk
Former civil parishes in Norfolk
Sugar refineries
Broadland